Zain Ejiofor Asher  (born 27 August 1983) is a British Nigerian news anchor at CNN International, based in New York City.
She currently anchors the network's primetime, global news show One World with Zain Asher airing weekdays at 12pm ET. Her memoir Where The Children Take Us was published by HarperCollins in April 2022.

Early life and education
Asher was born to Nigerian parents in London and grew up in West Norwood, South London. Her mother Obiajulu was a pharmacist working in Brixton and her father Arinze was a doctor. In 1988, her father was killed in a car accident during a road trip in Nigeria when she was five years old. Her older brother, actor Chiwetel Ejiofor, was the only passenger in the car and the accident's sole survivor. She is of Igbo descent; her family are originally from Enugu state, Nigeria. 

Asher attended Oxford University and graduated in 2005 with a degree in French and Spanish. The following year, she attended the Graduate School of Journalism at Columbia University, in New York City. In 2021, she was named an honorary fellow of Keble College, Oxford University.

Early career
After graduation, Asher initially worked as a receptionist at a production company before becoming a freelance reporter at News 12 Brooklyn where she covered local news. She also worked as a reporter for Money, where she wrote personal finance articles about careers and investing before moving to CNN.

CNN
In 2012, Asher met a CNN executive who invited her to the company headquarters in New York for a screen test. She was first hired as a business correspondent before becoming an anchor at CNN International based in Atlanta.
In 2014, she reported from Abuja, Nigeria on the hundreds of Chibok schoolgirls kidnapped by Boko Haram. She has also anchored breaking news coverage during August 2020 explosion in Beirut, the End SARS protests in Nigeria, and the deaths of Fidel Castro, Muhammad Ali and George Michael. 
 Since 2021, she has anchored One World with Zain Asher, airing weekdays on CNNI.

Book
Her memoir Where The Children Take Us was released by HarperCollins on 26 April 2022. 
The book was inspired by her 2015 Tedx talk "Trust Your Struggle", which has been viewed 2.2 million times on YouTube as of 2022.

Personal life 
Asher resides in Montclair, New Jersey with her husband and two sons.

See also
 List of Igbo people

References

1983 births
Living people
people from West Norwood
Alumni of Keble College, Oxford
Black British television personalities
British expatriates in the United States
CNN people
Columbia University Graduate School of Journalism alumni
English people of Igbo descent
English people of Nigerian descent
English women journalists
Igbo journalists
Igbo television personalities